Sardar Ali Raza Khan Dreshak is a Pakistani politician who was a Member of the Provincial Assembly of the Punjab, from September 2013 to May 2018.

Early life and education
He was born on 9 October 1977 in Lahore to Sardar Nasrullah Khan Dreshak.

He has a degree of Bachelor of Science where he obtained in 1998 from Government College, Lahore, a degree of Bachelor of Laws (Hons) where he received in 2000 from University of London. He did Bar-at-Law from the Lincoln's Inn in 2004.

Political career

He was elected to the Provincial Assembly of the Punjab as a candidate of Pakistan Tehreek-e-Insaf from Constituency PP-247 (Rajanpur-I) in 2013 Pakistani general election.

In September 2018, a deputy commissioner from Rajanpur accused Dreshak and his father of illegally interfering in transfers and postings of members of Revenue Department and officials of the Border Military Police.

References

Living people
1977 births
Baloch politicians
Punjab MPAs 2013–2018
Pakistan Tehreek-e-Insaf politicians
Sardar Ali Raza Khan